Andrew of Cornwall (Andreas Cornubiensis, Andreas de Cornubia, André de Cornouailles) (fl. 1290s) was a philosopher at Oxford during the 1290s.  He is thought to have introduced Parisian Modism into England, and possibly to have influenced the young Duns Scotus.  These conclusions are tentative, since we are almost totally ignorant of the details of Andrew's life, and the dates and location of his activities are not certain.

References
 
 Grabmann, Martin 1936 "Mitteilungen aus Munchener Handschriften uber bisher unbekannte Philosophen der Artistenfakultat (cod. lat. 14246 u7nd 14388) in id., Mittelalterliches Geistesleben II. Max Hueber: Munchen.

Medieval Cornish people
13th-century philosophers
13th-century English people